Eucodonia is a genus of flowering plants belonging to the family Gesneriaceae.

Its native range is Southern Mexico.

Species:

Eucodonia andrieuxii 
Eucodonia verticillata

References

Gesnerioideae
Gesneriaceae genera